The Boccia Individual BC3 event at the 2008 Summer Paralympics was held in the Olympic Green Convention Center on 7–9 September.
The preliminary stages consisted of 6 round-robin groups of 4 competitors each. The winner of each group plus the two best second place players (decided from among those with two match victories by points difference) qualified for the final stages.
The event was won by Park Keon Woo, representing .

Results
 indicates matches in which an extra (fifth) end was played

Preliminaries

Pool A

Pool B

Pool C

Pool D

Pool E

Pool F

Competition bracket

References

Boccia at the 2008 Summer Paralympics